Roer was a department of the French First Republic and later First French Empire in present-day Germany and the Netherlands. It was named after the river Roer (Rur), which flows through the department. It was formed in 1797, when the left bank of the Rhine was occupied by the French. The department was formed from the duchies of Jülich and Cleves, the part of the Archbishopric of Cologne left of the Rhine, the Free City of Aachen, the Prussian part of the duchy of Guelders and some smaller territories. In 1805 the city of Wesel was added to the department. The capital was Aix-la-Chapelle (Aachen).

The department was subdivided in the following arrondissements and cantons (situation in 1812):

 Aachen (Aix-la-Chapelle), cantons: Aachen (2 cantons), Burtscheid, Düren, Eschweiler, Froitzheim, Geilenkirchen, Gemünd, Heinsberg, Linnich, Monschau and Sittard.
 Cleves, cantons: Cleves, Geldern, Goch, Horst, Kalkar, Kranenburg, Wankum, Wesel and Xanten.
 Krefeld (Crefeld), cantons: Krefeld, Bracht, Erkelenz, Kempen, Moers, Neersen, Neuss, Odenkirchen, Rheinberg, Uerdingen, Viersen
 Cologne, cantons: Cologne (4 cantons), Bergheim, Brühl, Dormagen, Elsen, Jülich, Kerpen, Lechenich, Weiden and Zülpich.

Its population in 1812 was 631,094.

After Napoleon was defeated in 1814, the department was divided between the United Kingdom of the Netherlands (left bank of the Meuse and a strip along its right bank including Gennep, Tegelen and Sittard, in present-day Dutch Limburg) and the Kingdom of Prussia (Province of Jülich-Cleves-Berg, now part of North Rhine-Westphalia, Germany).

References

Former departments of France in Germany
Former departments of France in the Netherlands
History of Limburg (Netherlands)
History of the Rhineland
Former states and territories of North Rhine-Westphalia
1797 establishments in France
History of the Eifel